Ab Barik (also Romanized as Āb Bārīḵ) is a village in Tabar Rural District, Jolgeh Shoqan District, Jajrom County, North Khorasan Province, Iran. At the 2006 census, its population was 14, in 12 families.

References 

Populated places in Jajrom County